PASC  may refer to:
 Long COVID, also known as post-acute sequelae of COVID-19 or post-acute sequelae of SARS-CoV-2
 PASC audio compression, a version of MPEG-1 Audio Layer I
 Pancreatic stellate cell (PaSC)
Portable Applications Standards Committee of the IEEE Computer Society
 Public Administration Select Committee in the British Parliament
 Deadhorse Airport (ICAO location indicator: PASC), Alaska, United States